Jeffries Wyman (August 11, 1814 – September 4, 1874) was an American  naturalist and anatomist, born in Chelmsford, Massachusetts.    Wyman died in Bethlehem, New Hampshire of a pulmonary hemorrhage.

Career
He graduated Harvard College in 1833 and Harvard Medical School in 1837.  He was made curator at Lowell Institute, Boston, in 1839 and remained affiliated there until 1842.  Fees from Lowell Institute lectures enabled him to study in Europe, from 1841-1842, where he had the opportunity to study under anatomist Richard Owen in London. Upon his return to the United States, he had hoped to gain a professorship at Harvard College but the position went to Asa Gray.  In 1843, he was elected professor of anatomy and physiology at Hampden-Sydney College, Richmond, Virginia.  A series of letters written between 1843 and 1848 to his Boston friend and fellow M.D., David Humphreys Storer, reveal his unhappiness with the quality of the school, the treatment of the professors, and life in the South, writing "as soon as circumstances will permit I shall make my way back to the glorious city of Boston, the like of which exists not on the face of the earth." In 1847, he got his wish when he became Hersey Professor of Anatomy at Harvard College, where he remained until his death, becoming the first curator of the Peabody Museum of Archaeology and Ethnology there in 1866.  He made extensive and valuable collections in comparative anatomy and archæology, and he published nearly 70 scientific papers. He was the president of the American Association for the Advancement of Science in 1858.  Although he did not achieve the fame of some of his contemporaries, he was respected by peers: "In his special branches his authority was recognized the world over."  In 1866, he was elected as a member to the American Philosophical Society. Wyman was elected a member of the American Antiquarian Society in 1868.

Colleagues
In addition to studying with Richard Owen in London in 1842, Wyman also attended lectures by Achille Valenciennes, Isidore Geoffroy Saint-Hilaire, Marie Jean Pierre Flourens, and Etienne Serres in Paris.  At Harvard, his colleagues included Oliver Wendell Holmes, Asa Gray, and Louis Agassiz. He also, with American physician and missionary Thomas Staughton Savage, first scientifically described the gorilla. Holmes also testified in the Parkman-Webster Murder Case.  After Wyman's death, his former student Burt G. Wilder eulogized him as "regarded by all as the highest anatomical authority in America, and the compeer of Owen, Huxley, and Gegenbauer in the Old World."

Parkman-Webster murder case

In 1850, Wyman was called to testify for the prosecution in the trial of Dr. John White Webster, on trial for the murder of Dr. George Parkman.  His recognized authority as a comparative anatomist caused the coroner, Jabez Pratt, to call upon him to examine the bones when they were found in November 1849.  His testimony concerned the fragments of bones found in the furnace.  He cataloged them as to the parts of the body to which they belonged (noting that no bones were duplicates so that the fragments belonged to a single body), and his testimony regarding the jawbone contributed to the belief that the bones belonged to Dr. Parkman.  Wyman also testified as to the alleged bloodstains found on pantaloons and slippers belonging to Dr. Webster.

Parkman's gaunt figure was known on the streets of Boston.  A sketch of Dr. Parkman as he was last seen was published in the New York Globe's account of the trial.  While the bones could not be definitively identified as Dr. Parkman, Wyman contributed to the belief that they were Parkman's by providing the court with a "diagram, exhibiting the position in the skeleton, of the bones found and showing, (in some degree,) what would be necessary to complete the body."  This rendering was remarkably similar in stance to the sketch of Parkman striding and was labeled "Restoration of Dr. Parkman's Skeleton," no doubt influencing the jury.

Coincidentally, Wyman's brother, Dr. Morrill Wyman, and his wife, had spent the evening of Parkman's disappearance with Webster and his  wife at the home of Harvard professor Daniel Treadwell.

Views on evolution and correspondence with Darwin
Wyman was a theist who attended the Unitarian Church at Harvard and as such leaned toward a belief in a "theistic, morphological form of evolution rather than natural selection." Two historians of science who chronicles Wyman's career, A. Hunter Dupree and Toby Appel, disagreed as to Wyman's reception of Darwin's theories of evolution and natural selection.  Dupree believed that Wyman's religious beliefs caused him to struggle with Darwin's theories, accepting them "only by intense effort both as a scientist and a person."  Appel disagreed with Dupree, believing that Wyman had no difficulty accepting Darwin's theory of evolution but that his work in philosophical anatomy made it "doubtful that he ever accepted natural selection."  In her article, Appel makes a case for Wyman as a proponent of philosophical anatomy at Harvard, along with Louis Agassiz and Asa Gray.  Philosophical anatomy, also known as transcendental anatomy, was the "search for ideal patterns of structure in nature."  This search did not prevent Wyman and Gray in accepting evolution, although Agassiz never did.  However, unlike Gray, Wyman could not accept natural selection as the method of evolution, believing instead in evolution as "directed by the Creator."

When On the Origin of Species was published in 1859, Wyman's one-time mentor, Richard Owen came out against the book, while his colleague Asa Gray supported it.  In 1860, Darwin went to Gray to enlist Wyman's support due to Wyman's work on higher apes and anatomy.  Wyman wrote to Darwin agreeing that "progressive development is a far more probable theory than progressive creations", and the two men corresponded between 1860 and 1866, with Darwin writing at one point "I know hardly anyone whose opinions I should be more inclined to defer to."

Personal life
Wyman was married in 1850 to Adeline Wheelwright, with whom he had two daughters, Mary and Susan.  Wheelwright died in 1855 and in 1861, he married Annie Williams Whitney, with whom he had a son, Jeffries Wyman, Jr.  Whitney died in 1864, the year of their son's birth.  In 1978, the Peabody Museum published Dear Jeffie, a collection of letters and sketches that Wyman had written to his son from 1866 to 1874 (the year of his own death) when he was doing field work in the states and abroad. His brother Dr. Morrill Wyman was a respected Cambridge doctor; their father Dr. Rufus Wyman was the first director of the McLean Asylum. Ironically, Dr. George Parkman had sought the directorship of the asylum, another connection between Parkman and the Wymans.

His grandson, also named Jeffries Wyman (1901–1995), was a molecular biologist and biophysicist, and he was also a professor at Harvard.

Notes

References

 Appel, Toby A. "Jeffries Wyman, Philosophical Anatomy, and the Scientific Reception of Darwin in America" in Journal of the History of Biology 1988 21(1), pages 69–94.
 Appel, Toby A.  "Wyman, Jeffries"; http://www.anb.org/articles/13/13-01864.html; American National Biography Online February  2000
 Bemis, George. Report of the Case of John W. Webster. CC Little and J Brown, 1850.
 Dupree, A. Hunter. "Jeffries Wyman's Views on Evolution" in Isis 1953 44(3), pages 243-246.
 Dupree, A. Hunter. "Some Letters from Charles Darwin to Jeffries Wyman" in Isis 1951 42(2), pages 104-110.
 Gifford, George E. Jr. (ed.) "An American in Paris, 1841-842: Four Letters from Jeffries Wyman" in Journal of the History of Medicine and Allied Sciences 1967 22, pages 274-285.
 Gifford, George E. Jr. (ed.) Dear Jeffie: Being the Letters from Jeffries Wyman, first director of the Peabody Museum, to his son, Jeffries Wyman, Jr. (1978)
 Gifford, George E. Jr. (ed.) "Twelve Letters from Jeffries Wyman, M.D. Hampden-Sydney Medical College, Richmond, Virginia, 1843-1848" in Journal of the History of Medicine and Allied Sciences 1965 20, pages 309-333.
Hall, James. Whitney, J. "GEOLOGICAL SURVEY OF STATE OF WISCONSIN, Vol. 1" 1862, CHAPTER VII - Observations upon the Mammalian Remains of extinct and existing Species found in the Crevices of the Lead-bearing rock, and in the Superficial Accumulations within the Lead Region of Wisconsin and Iowa.  (By Prof. JEFFRIES WYMAN) 
 Stone, James Winchell. Report of the Trial of Prof. John W. Webster. Phillips, Sampson, & Company, 1850.
 Sullivan, Robert. The Disappearance of Dr. Parkman. (1971)
 Wilder, B. G. Leading American Men of Science, edited by D. S. Jordan (New York, 1910)
 Wilder, B. G. "Sketch of Dr. Jeffries Wyman" in Popular Science Monthly 1875 6, pages 355-360.

External links 
 
 Jeffries Wyman Papers,1832–1936 (inclusive), 1849–1874 (bulk). H MS c 12. Harvard Medical Library, Francis A. Countway Library of Medicine, Boston, Mass.

1814 births
1874 deaths
Hampden–Sydney College faculty
American science writers
Deaths from pulmonary hemorrhage
Harvard College alumni
Harvard Medical School alumni
Members of the American Antiquarian Society
People from Chelmsford, Massachusetts
Phillips Exeter Academy alumni
Theistic evolutionists
Harvard College faculty